Chandpur is a town and a municipal board (nagar palika parishad) in Bijnor district  in the Indian state of Uttar Pradesh, India.

Geography 
Chandpur has an average elevation of 51 metres (167 feet).

Chandpur is located at a distance of 130 km from the capital of New Delhi, 65 km from Meerut, and 38 km from Gajraula on National Highway 9. The Bijnor district is bordered by the districts of Meerut, Muzzafarnagar, Moradabad, Jyotibaphule Nagar of Uttar Pradesh & Haridwar, Pauri Garhwal, Udham Singh Nagar and Nainital of Uttarakhand. River Ganga flows at a distance of 20 km from Chandpur.

Demographics
, according to the India census, Chandpur has a population of 83,441 of which 43,354 are males while 40,087 are females, population of Children with age of 0-6 is 12390 which is 14.85% of total population of Chandpur (NPP). Female Sex Ratio is of 925 against state average of 912. Moreover, Child Sex Ratio in Chandpur is around 923 compared to Uttar Pradesh state average of 902. Literacy rate of Chandpur city is 70.15% higher than state average of 67.68%. In Chandpur, Male literacy is around 74.73% while female literacy rate is 65.20%.

Religion 
Religion data as per Census 2011:
 Muslim : 71.77%
 Hindu: 27.43%
 Christian: 0.14%
 Sikh: 0.50%

Post office
Chandpur city pin code is 246725. It has two post offices in the city and many box offices.

Transport

Chandpur has railway connections to New Delhi, Lucknow, Saharanpur, Roorkee, Chandigarh, Dehradun, Ghaziabad, Najibabad, Moradabad etc. There are direct bus services between Chandpur and a number of other cities and schools.

	Mussoorie Express
	Garhwal Express
	lucknow chandigarh express
       Najibabad-aligarh passenger
       Najibabad-gajrula passenger
There are direct bus services between New Delhi and Chandpur, with buses connecting to the Anand Vihar bus stand in New Delhi and some other bus stop at Delhi

	Anand Vihar
	Okhla 
	Shadra
	Delhi
	Mayur vihar phase 1
	Noida City Centre 
       Hauz Khas Village
       Botanical Garden (Noida sec 37)

There are direct bus services between

	saharanpur—chandpur
	ghaziabaad—chandpur
	Bijnor-Chandpur
	haridwaar—chandpur
	aligarh—chandpur
	meerut—chandpur
	bareilly—chandpur
	moradabad-chandpur
	najibabbad—chandpur
	Kanpur—chandpur
	Jhansi—chandpur
	Azamgarh—chandpur
	agra—chandpur
       Dehradun-chandpur

People from Chandpur
Atma Ram (scientist)
Subhash C. Kashyap
Maulana Murtaza Hasan Chandpuri
Raashid Alvi
Vishal Bhardwaj
Kausar Chandpuri (1900–1990), Indian physician and writer 
Kuldip Singh Chandpuri (born 1940), Indian military officer 
Qayem Chandpuri (1722–1793), Indian poet 
Raaz Chandpuri (1892–1969), Indian Urdu writer and literary critic

See also
 Chandpuri

References

Cities and towns in Bijnor district